Year 975 (CMLXXV) was a common year starting on Friday (link will display the full calendar) of the Julian calendar.

Events 
 By place 

 Byzantine Empire 
 Arab–Byzantine War: Emperor John I raids Mesopotamia and invades Syria, using the Byzantine base at Antioch to press southwards to Tripoli. He conquers the cities of Baalbek, Damascus, Sidon, Tiberias and Caesarea, but fails to take Jerusalem.

 Europe 
 October 15 – Oberto I (Obizzo), an Italian count palatine, dies. The Marca Obertenga (Eastern Liguria) is divided among the Obertenghi family.
 Emperor Otto II (the Red) leads a punitive expedition against Boleslaus II, duke of Bohemia (approximate date).

 England 
 July 8 – King Edgar I (the Peaceful) dies at Winchester after a 16-year reign. He is succeeded by his 12-year-old son Edward II (the Martyr) as ruler of England.

 Africa 
 December 21 – Caliph Al-Mu'izz dies in Egypt after a 22-year reign in which he has extended his realm from Sicily to the Atlantic. He is succeeded by his son Al-Aziz Billah as ruler of the Fatimid Caliphate.

 China 
 Emperor Taizu conquers Hunan Province and brings the power of the military under Song control. Ending the era of the warlords (approximate date).

 By topic 

 Religion 

 March – Otto II appoints his archchancellor Willigis as archbishop of Mainz. He receives the pallium from Pope Benedict VII.

Births 
 July 25 – Thietmar, bishop of Merseburg (d. 1018)
 Adalbold II, bishop of Utrecht (d. 1026)
 Amadeus I, count of Savoy (approximate date)
 Bouchard II, French nobleman (d. 1020)
 Conrad I, German nobleman (d. 1011)
 Cunigunde, Holy Roman Empress (d. 1040)
 Elijah, bishop of Beth Nuhadra (d. 1046)
 Gerard I, bishop of Cambrai (approximate date)
 Gero II, German nobleman (d. 1015)
 Guo, empress of the Song Dynasty (d. 1007)
 Hugh of Chalon, French bishop (approximate date)
 Izumi Shikibu, Japanese poet (approximate date)
 Oldřich, duke of Bohemia (approximate date)
 Sophia I, German princess and abbess (d. 1039)
 Stephen I, king of Hungary (approximate date)

Deaths 
 June 28 
 Cyneweard, bishop of Wells (Somerset)
 Thurcytel, abbot of Crowland (approximate date)
 July 4 – Gwangjong (Wang So), Korean king (b. 925)
 July 8 – Edgar I (the Peaceful), king of England
 July 31 – Fu Yanqing, Chinese general (b. 898)
 October 15 – Oberto I, Italian count palatine
 November 12 – Notker Physicus, Swiss painter
 November 26 – Conrad, bishop of Constance
 December 21 – Al-Mu'izz, Fatimid caliph (b. 932)
 December 27 – Balderic, bishop of Utrecht (b. 897)
 Bilgetegin, Samanid officer and governor
 Cináed ua hArtacáin, Irish Gaelic poet
 Dyfnwal ab Owain, king of Strathclyde
 Gu Hongzhong, Chinese painter (b. 937)
 Master Geng, Chinese alchemist
 Olof II, king of Sweden (approximate date)
 Theobald I, Frankish nobleman (b. 913)
 Wynsige (or Wynsy), bishop of Lichfield 
 Yongming Yanshou, Chinese Zen master (b. 904)

References